Presenza is the house organ of Università Cattolica del Sacro Cuore.

History
This magazine was founded in 1969 in Milan. Currently, this magazine is produced in collaboration with the School of Journalism of the University (ALMED - Postgraduate School of Media Communications and Performing Arts). The director of the magazine is Lorenzo Ornaghi.

See also
 List of magazines in Italy

References

1969 establishments in Italy
House organs
Catholic magazines published in Italy
Italian-language magazines
Magazines established in 1969
Magazines published in Milan
Università Cattolica del Sacro Cuore

it:Presenza